National Popular Vote may refer to:
 National Popular Vote Interstate Compact, an Electoral College reform proposal adopted or being considered by the legislatures of the several U.S. states plus the District of Columbia
 National Popular Vote Inc., a non-profit group which promotes the National Popular Vote Interstate Compact